The Prince Who Worked as Satan's Servant and Saved the King from Hell (Lithuanian: Apė karaliūnaitį, kur pas šėtoną slūžyjo ir karalių išgelbėjo iš peklos) is a Lithuanian fairy tale collected by German linguists August Leskien and Karl Brugmann.  Andrew Lang included it in The Grey Fairy Book under the title The Magician's Horse.

Synopsis

A king's three sons went hunting, and the youngest got lost.  He came to a great hall and ate there.  Then he found an old man, who asked him who he was.  He told how he had become lost and offered to enter his service.  The old man set him to keep the stove lit, to fetch the firewood from the forest, and to take care of the black horse in the stables.

The man was a magician, and the fire was the source of his power, though he did not tell the prince.

One day, the prince nearly let the fire go out, and the old man stormed in.  Frightened, the prince threw another log on it and nursed it back.

The horse told him to saddle and bridle it, to use an ointment that made his hair like gold, and to pile all the wood he could on the fire.  This set the hall on fire.  The horse then told him to take  looking-glass, a brush and a riding-whip, and ride off on him.  The magician chased on a roan horse, but the prince threw down the looking glass, the horse cut its feet on it, and the magician had to go back to put new shoes on him, but then he chased the prince again.  The horse had the prince throw the brush on the ground.  This produced a thick wood, and the magician had to go back and get an axe to cut through it, but then he chased the prince again.  The prince threw down the whip; it became a river, and when the magician tried to cross it, it put out his magical fire and killed him.

The horse told the prince to strike the ground with a willow wand.  A door opened, making a hall in which the horse stayed, but he sent the prince through the fields to take service with a king.  He wore a scarf to hide his golden hair.  He worked as a gardener and every day brought half his food to the horse.

One day, the horse told him that the king's three daughters would choose their husbands:  a great company of lords would gather, and they would throw their diamond apples into the air.   The man at whose feet the apple stopped would be the bridegroom.  He should be in the garden, nearby, and the youngest's would roll to him; he should take it up at once.

He did.  The scarf slipped a little, the princess saw his hair and fell in love at once, and the king, though reluctant, let them marry.

Soon after, the king had to go to war.  He gave the prince a broken-down nag.  The prince went to the black horse; it gave him arms and armor, and he rode it to battle and won the battle, but fled before he could be clearly seen.  Twice more, he went to war, but the third time, he was wounded, and the king bound his wound with his own handkerchief.  The princess his wife recognized it and revealed it to her father.  There was great rejoicing, and the king gave him half his kingdom.

Analysis

Tale type
The tale is classified in the international Aarne-Thompson-Uther Index as type ATU 314, "The Goldener": a youth with golden hair works as the king's gardener. The type may also open with the prince for some reason being the servant of an evil being, where he gains the same gifts, and the tale proceeds as in this variant.

The tale's collectors, August Leskien and Karl Brugman noted that it belonged to a cycle of stories wherein the hero works for a magician (or the devil) and finds a horse. The horse becomes his companion and helps him flee from the magician's clutches until they reach another kingdom, where the hero works in a menial position and the princess falls in love with him. This narrative is called by scholarship Goldenermärchen, after its main feature: the protagonist acquires golden hair early in the story.

Another name for the tale type ATU 314 is "The Man with Scurvy" (Le Teigneux, in French), because the hero hides his golden hair under a pig's bladder, which, according to Paul Delarue, gives him an appearance of a person with scurvy. Researcher Genevieve Massignon, on the other hand, stated that the hero hides his golden appearance under the pretense of having ringworm.

Motifs 
According to Stith Thompson, "a standard part" of tale type ATU 314 is motif D672, "The Obstacle Flight", in the Motif-Index of Folk-Literature: the hero escapes on the horse and both delay the villain's pursuit by throwing objects behind them to create obstacles. Usually, they throw a stone (which becomes a mountain), a comb (which becomes a forest) and a flint (which produces a great fire).

Scholars Ibrahim Muhawi and Sharif Kanaana noted the core narrative sequence of the tale type involves the hero riding three horses to either save the kingdom, or to obtain a certain remedy. Either way, he gains his father-in-law's favour and is crowned king after him.

Alternate openings
Scholarship notes three different opening episodes to the tale type: (1) the hero becomes a magician's servant and is forbidden to open a certain door, but he does and dips his hair in a pool of gold; (2) the hero is persecuted by his stepmother, but his loyal horse warns him and later they both flee; (3) the hero is given to the magician as payment for the magician's help with his parents' infertility problem.

Related types
These three tale types (ATU 502, ATU 314 and AaTh 532), which refer to a male protagonist expelled from home, are said to be "widespread in Europe".

ATU 502: The Wild Man as Helper
A less common variant, found only in Europe - according to Stith Thompson  - , opens with the hero rescuing a wild man, as in Iron John, Guerrino and the Savage Man, and The Hairy Man - tales classified as ATU 502, "The Wild Man as Helper". However, professor Jack Haney stated that the tale type is said to be common in Russian and Ukraine, but "disseminated" in Western Europe. The type can also be found in India, Indonesia and Turkey.

AaTh 532: "I Don't Know"
Another related set of stories was former tale type AT 532, "I Don't Know" or Neznaïko (fr) (a sapient horse instructs the hero to play dumb), a tale type that, according to Linda Dégh, is "particularly widespread" in the Central and Eastern regions of Europe. This type happens in Hungarian tale Nemtutka and Russian tale Story of Ivan, the Peasant's Son.

Other tales
A similar tale is found in Thailand, as one of its most popular: Sangthong or Phra Sangthong ("Prince of the Golden Conch"). In this tale, prince Sangthong, born with a shell, is expelled from the kingdom with his mother and take refuge with an old couple. His mother breaks his shell. He departs and is taken in by a giantess. One day, he jumps into a golden well and his body acquires a gilded appearance. He disguises himself with "an ugly mask", calls himself Chao Ngo and goes to the Samon Kingdom. He marries the seventh daughter of King Samon, named Rodjana, who sees his through the disguise, but everyone else sees him as an ugly person. The king banishes his daughter after their marriage. At the end, prince Sangthong saves the Samon Kingdom.

Variants

Distribution
This particular type of tale is well known, being particularly found in Germany, Scandinavia, and the Baltic, but also throughout Europe, and appears in Asia down to Indonesia and also in Africa.

Hasan El-Shamy indicated that the tale type is "widely spread" in North Africa.

Europe

Lithuania
Lithuanian folklorist , in his analysis of Lithuanian folktales (published in 1936), listed 37 Lithuanian variants of type 314, Magiškas bėgimas arkliui padedant ("Magical Escape with the Help of a Horse"). In the updated Lithuanian Folktale Catalogue, by professor , the tale type is indexed as type 314, Arkliu paverstas jaunuolis ("Youth Transformed to a Horse"), totalling 62 variants and 58 combined with other tale types.

Albania 
Slavicist , in his study on Balkan folklore, collected an Albanian language tale he translated as Le Chauve ("The Bald One"). In this tale, God grants a couple a son. A strange merchant comes and takes the boy as his apprentice, but he abandons the boy in the mountains to die. The boy, however, is saved by three fairies that live in the mountain; they feed and raise the boy until he is old enough. They give him a set of keys and forbid him to open a certain door while they are away, but he does exactly that after they depart; he finds a winged horse inside. The boy rides the horse away from the fairies and manages to escape from the three of them. Despite his escape, the elder fairy advises him to take on a shabby disguise and pluck three hairs from the horse to summon it. The boy then finds work as a king's gardener in a distant city. One day, he summons the horse to trample the garden, and the youngest princes witnesses him. Some time later, the king's three daughters are to choose their husbands by tossing golden apples to suitors while they pass b the window. The elder two choose princes, while the youngest chooses the gardener. For this perceived affront, the king banishes the youngest to the goose barn. Later, the king becomes blind, and only the "voda-živa" ("water of life") can cure him. The gardener rides on a lame horse to begin his quest; but ditches his mount and summons the winged horse. He finds the water of life and brings it to the king, then reveals he was the baldheaded gardener.

Caucasus Region 
In a tale from the Karachay-Balkar language translated to Russian as "Быжмапапах" ("Byzhmapapakh"), a shepherd sees children running about and sighs that he has no children. Suddenly, a diminute man (of one karysh) with a large beard (of a thousand karysh) appears, thinking he was summoned by the man. At any rate, the diminute man gives the shepherd an apple to be given to the man's wife, with one condition: after the his son is born, they have to let him leave home and not return until he is married. The shepherd obeys the diminute man's instructions, and a golden-haired son is born to them. Years later, when the boy comes of age, the shepherd follows the diminute man's orders and convinces his son to depart. The boy is given provisions for the road and begins his journey. His path leads him to an abandoned barn where three horses are kept. The horses can talk and convince the boy to keep them, and tell him to pluck a hair from their tails; he can light the hairs to summon the horses if he needs any help. Finally, he reaches a group of shepherds and dines with them. The shepherds talk about their khan, and, moved by their words, the boy decides to find work as a servant to the khan. The khan agrees and takes him im; the other servants mockingly call him Byzhmapapakh. The khan's youngest daughter sees Byzhmapapakh and falls in love with him. Some time later, the three princesses decide they want to get married and, on the matchmaker's advice, bring three watermelons to their father as analogy to their marriageability. The khan cuts open the watermelons (one rotten, the second overripe, the third ripe enough), and summons sons of khans for his daughters to choose. The elder princesses give their pryanik (in the Russian translation; a type of gingerbread cake) to their chosen ones, while the youngest gives theirs to Byzhmapapakh, to her sisters' jeer and her father's irritation. The khan marries his elder daughters in grand ceremonies, and banishes the youngest to a chicken coop. Later, the khan falls ill, and can only be cured by eating lioncub's meat and drinking lioness's milk. The khan's sons-in-law go to hunt for some lions; Byzhmapapakh joins the hunt on a lame horse, but, out of sight, summons one of the horses, gallops away to the steppes and finds a lioness. The lioness begs to be spared; Byzhmapapakh agrees to spare it, in return for its lioncub and the milk. On the road back, he meets his brothers-in-law, who do not recognize him, and spins a story about needing the meat for his mother. The brothers-in-law ask for some; Byzhmapapakh agrees, in exchange for him branding their shoulders. The next day, the khan asks for some deer meat. The sons-in-law march again to the hunt, but Byzhmapapakh finds the deer meat first, and agrees to share it with them as long as they agree to be branded on their flanks. At the end of the tale, the khan holds a grand feast and invites his two sons-in-law. Byzhmapapakh appears unannounced and gifts his father-in-law one of the horses. The khan rides the animals for a bit, impressed by its prowess, and asks the stranger about his identity. Byzhmapapakh tells him everything, including the marks on the brothers-in-law.

America
Native American variants of this type were assumed by Stith Thompson to have originated from French-Canadian sources.

Gerald E. Aucoin reported 82 variants of type ATU 314 in Canada. A later study by researchers Carolle Richard and Yves Boisvert registered 101 recorded variants in the Laval University archives: 59 from Québec, 30 from Acadia, 5 from Ontario and 7 from the United States.

Franz Boas collected a tale from a Zuni source with the title The Sold Child. In this tale, a poor Mexican man from Palos Altos goes to the forest to cut wood, and a catfish emerges from the river and asks the man to give it the first thing that meets him. The man goes home and his own son greets him, which forces him to surrender his son to the fish. The boy lives with the catfish, who raises the boy, until one day the boy, all grown up, follows a Antelope-Girl to a house where he finds a girl. The girl asks him to marry her, but first he has to ask for his parents' blessing. The boy asks the catfish for his birth parents, and is told of a store owner and his wife in Los Lunas. The boy rides a horse and pays a visit to the couple. After explaining the whole story and talking about the girl at the house, the couple give their son a candle and matches so he can better see his intended bride at night. The boy rides back to the hut and lights a candle on his bride while she is asleep, but lets a drop of wax fall on her. With that, the girl's house changes back to an antelope's burrow, and he is all alone in the world. He wanders off the plains and climbs up a tree to flee from a coyote pack, when he sees a light in the distance. He climbs down the tree and goes to the fire, where a person named Distella Glande (estrella grande, 'great star') is. The great star takes the boy in as his servant and orders him to kill a steer every day and fill a trough with water, but forbids him from entering a nearby shed. One day, the fulfills his tasks and gets curious about what lies in the shed. He opens it and finds a bay horse readily saddled. The horse talks to him that Distella Glande is planning to devour the boy, and that they must make their escape. The boy closes the shed and steps into a lead well, injuring his foot. The great star comes back and asks the boy what happened to his foot, and he lies that the great star's knife and axe hurt him. The next morning, the boy releases the horse, takes its comb and brush, a steer's stomach and the lead well with him, and rides away. The great star discovers the boy fled on the horse and chases after him. Sensing his approach, the horse tells the boy to throw behind them the comb (with creates a large lake), the brush (which becomes a thick timber), and the steer's stomach (which becomes rocks and canyons). As a last effort, the horse asks to be fed the lead, and shoots bullets at the great star, killing him. The horse instructs the boy to take the great star's organs and throw at different cardinal points: his head becomes the morning star, the heart the evening star, and his instestines the seven stars. The boy rides a bit more and finds a Black man near the river. The horse suggests they kill the man and skin him. The animal kicks the Black man in the head and kills him, the boy takes his skin and wears it, then ties a rock to the body and throws it in the river. The boy, in the Black man's disguise, reaches a city and the horse advises him to ask the king for a job in the royal gardens pruning the trees. It happens so. During his stay at the castle, the king orders his four daughters, the princesses, to take some food for the gardener, but they all fear him save the youngest, Angelina. One day, the youngest princess takes a tray of food to him and spies on him washing the Black man's skin in a ditch. The boy wears the skin again over his white skin and goes to talk to the princess. Later, the horse advises the boy to go to the king for one of his daughters in marriage, and, if the king refuses, he should let the princesses choose for themselves. The boy, in the Black skin's disguise, follows the animal's advice; the monarch summons his four daughters: the elder three deny marrying the gardener, but Angelina chooses him and moves out to his orchard. Later, war breaks out with the Navaho, and the king sends his gardener son-in-law to join in the fight. The boy takes off his disguise, rides the horse to kill the enemy Navahos and take their scalps as prizes, then goes back to the orchard to hang the scalps. After three confrontations, the horse decides to end their charade, since the lead supply they brought from the great star is shortening. After a final combat where they kill the Navaho, the boy and the horse present themselves to the king, his father-in-law, who welcomes him as his successor.

Africa

East Africa
In a tale from the Swahili titled The Wonderful Warrior, Abdallah, the Vizir's son, becomes the sultan's son's playmate, until the latter gets bored with him. Abdallah is expelled from the palace and wanders the desert. A Magician finds him and takes him in as his apprentice. One day, the Magician explains he will go on a journey, gives him the keys to his house, and warns him not to open a certain door. While the Magician is away, Abdallah opens every door, and sees a leopard, a lion and a talking sword. He opens the last door and finds a horse. The horse tells him that the Magician lured and devoured its previous owner, and that the same fate may befall Abdallah if they do not escape. The horse tells him to make preparations: take a saddle, the sword and seven bottles from a chest, and release the lion and the leopard. Abdallah escapes on the horse and sees a cloud of smoke coming after them: it is the Magician and some friends. The horse tells its rider to throw behind them one of the bottles to create obstacles: a forest of thorns, a mountain of stones, a wall of fire, and lastly a large sea-wave. Abdallah and the horse reach a kingdom, and the horse advises him to dress in poor and ragged clothes. Abdallah goes to the city to a crowd that gathered to see the princesses' husband selection by lemon-throwing. The seventh princess throws her lemon and it lands near Abdallah. Her father, the sultan, marries the princess to the gardener and places them in a poor hut. Some time later, war breaks out thee times, and three times Abdallah rides into battle to defend his father-in-law's kingdom: he rides the leopard on the first battle, the leopard on the second and the horse on the third.

In a tale from Zanzibar translated by George Bateman as The Magician and the Sultan’s Son, a sultan with three sons laments the fact that no one seems to be able to teach them anything. A magician named Mchaa′wee appears and asks to take one of the sultan's sons as a companion, and chooes the youngest, called Keejaa′naa. One day, the magician gives Keejaa′naa the keys to his house, and says he will away for a while. Keejaa′naa opens a door with a golden pool and dips his finger into it. The next time, the boy opens the remaining doors: he sees piles of animal bones and humans skulls, and finds a horse named Faraasee.

Author Alice Werner provided the summary of a story she considered to be "a composite tale" that spread with the Arabs. In this story, a sultan's son abandons his companion, a vizier's son, during a walk, and the latter is welcomed by a zimwi. The zimwi instructs the boy not to open a certain door, and goes to invite his friends for a cannibal feast. The vizier's son open the forbidden door and finds a giant horse inside, which warns him the zimwi is a cannibal, and urges the boy to release every animal in the house (an ox, a lion, a leopard and a donkey), steal seven magic bottles and escape with it away from the zimwi's lair. The horse swallows the animals to take along with him, and escapes with the boy in a "Magic Flight" sequence: the seven bottles are thrown behind them to create obstacles to their pursuers. The giant horse and the boy reach a remote destination, and it creates a large house for them. The boy assumes the identity of "Kibaraka" ('Little Blessing') and dresses up as a beggar. He goes to a nearby city just in time to take part in a suitor selection test: the local sultan's seven daughters are to throw limes to their husbands of choice, the elder six cast theirs to noble men and the seventh to Kibaraka. Later, the sultan falls ill, and only the meat of a certain bird can cure him. Kibaraka finds the bird in the forest and is approached by his six brothers-in-law, who wish for a share. Kibaraka, in regal clothes, agrees to let them have it, in exchange for him branding their backs. At the end of the tale, after fighting the sultan's enemies, Kibaraka reveals himself as Hamed, son of the Wazir of Basra. Linguist Jan Knappert published the tale as The Giant Horse, and sourced it from the Swahili.

Asia

West Asia 
In a Yemeni tale translated into German as Eselsfell ("[The One With A] Donkeyskin"), a sultan's son is victim of a ploy by his stepmother, who tries to seduce him, and is expelled from home with his horse. He stops to rest in the desert for the night, when the daughter of the King of the Djinns appears to him intent on helping him as his adoptive sister. She gives him a long strand of her hair to summon her help, and vanishes. The youth rides some more into a wadi and sees a dead donkey. He skins the donkey and makes a garment out of its hide. He then reaches a kingdom, ruled by a Sultan with seven daughters. Because of his strange vestments, the youth is mockingly called "Donkeyskin". One day, at the cistern, the boy waits for everyone to leave, before he takes off the donkey hide and bathes in the water. The sultan's seventh daughter sees him and falls in love with him. At the ceremony of selecting a husband, each of the princesses throws an apple to their suitors, the youngest and seventh princess throws her to Donkeyskin. Her father questions her choice, but she remains steadfast, so he marries her off to the lowly boy and banishes her from the palace to the stables. When a neighbouring Sultan threatens the kingdom, the Sultan's six sons-in-law rush to defend it, but Donkeyskin departs first, summons the Daughter of the King of the Djinns and asks her for a strong horse. He defeats the enemies, and goes back to his lowly disguise.

German linguist and Semitologist Gotthelf Bergsträsser published a Syrian tale from Ma'lula. In this tale, a widowed man remarries, but his new wife hates her step-son. The boy decides to run away from home, so he steals his father's magic wishing ring and leaves. On the journey, he trades clothes with a beggar and steals an animals intestines from a woman. He reaches another kingdom and finds work as a farmhand in a man's garden, and tells his name is Grindkopf. Later, when his employer is asleep, he uses the ring to summon a horse, an armor and a fez, and rides around the garden in secret. One day, his riding is spied on by the vizier's daughter, who falls in love with him. Later, she decides to look for a suitor, but fancies none of the men in the city, so it is suggested that every bachelor passes by her window and she will throw an apple to the one she chooses. The suggestion is carried out: every man in the city passes by the vizier's daughter's window, but she throws her apple to Grindkopf. Thinking his daughter made a wrong choice, the vizier summons everyone the next day, and still she chooses the Grindkopf. Enraged at her decision, the vizier agrees to marry his daughter to the lowly boy, but expels her from home to a lame cabin near the garden. Some time later, war breaks out, and the Grindkopf mounts a lame horse and joins the army, under sniding remarks. At a distance from the city, he doffs the shabby disguise, summons the horse with the ring and rides into battle. He vanquishes the enemies, but is hurt in the hand, which the vizier bandages. He returns home and resumes the Grindkopf identity. Back from the war, the vizier is advised to banish his son-in-law in order to avoid further humiliation, and pays a visit to his daughter. Inside the house, Grindkopf lies on the bed, and the vizier notices the bandaged hand. He realizes his son-in-law was the knight at the battlefield, and his daughter confirms his conclusions.

In an Iraqi tale collcted by E. S. Drower with the title The Blind Sultan, a sultan has two wives, an Arab woman, and a Abyssinian one, two sons by his first wife and one son by the second. After the elder brother marries an emir's daughter and the middle son a wizier's daughter, the younger brother leaves home and wanders around the world. On his journey, he helps a lion by dislogdging a thorn from its paw and he is given three hairs from its mane. The prince rubs the three hairs; three slaves appear before him. The youth asks for a flying mare and fine garments, then rides the mare to a city. He buys a sheep from a shepherd, kills it and makes a cap out of its paunch, then finds work as a gardener's apprentice near the Sultan's palace. The sultan's youngest daughter sees the boy and falls in love with him. Later, at the princesses' behest, the gardener brings three melons to their father, the Sultan, in order to assess their marriageability. The king decides it is past time he married his daughter and sets a suitor selection test: the princesses are to throw apples at their men of choice when they parade beneath their window. The two elder princesses choose, respectively, an emir's son and a wazir's son. When it is her turn, she sees that the gardener's apprentice is not at the gathering of suitors, and asks her father to bring him in. She throws her apple to the boy, much to her father's disgust, who marries them and exiles her younger daughter to the stables. Later, war breaks out with a neighbouring king, and the prince summons the flying mare to ride into battle and defeat his father-in-law's enemies. During the fight, his hand is injured, and the Sultan bandages him with a piece of a shawl. Their victory assured, the prince goes back to the gardener and to his lowly disguise. The Sultan returns to Baghdad and inquires if anyone has seen the fine and mysterious warrior, but none can give any answer. Distraught with grief over not finding the warrior, the Sultan falls ill and becomes blind, and the royal doctors prescribe lioness's milk served inside a lion's skin. The Sultan's two sons-in-law begin the quest, but lose all their money in a bet and are forced to work for a living. Finally, the prince rides through the same road, but meets an old man. By showing him kindness, the old man advises the prince on how to get the lioness's milk from a castle. His mission accomplished, the prince goes to the city where his brothers-in-law are and buys their freedom, having them accompany him. Before they return to Baghdad, the prince summons the three slaves and asks for a tent, where he welcomes his brothers-in-law and gives them a bag of lioness's milk diluted in water, in exchange for him branding their backs. Lastly, after the two sons-in-law give the Sultan the diluted milk, the prince gives the correct one and heals his father-in-law.

Philippines 
Folklorist Dean Fansler stated that a similar tale named Juan Tiñoso is "one of the most widely-known stories in the Islands". One popular version was a Pampangan metrical romance titled Story of the Life of King Don Octavio and Queen Teodora, together with that of their son Don Fernando, in the Kingdom of Spain, Don Octavio or Pugut Negru. In this story, the queen of Spain is barren, and only the pau-fruit can cure her infertility, but a giant holds the fruit in his orchard. The king of Spain looks the fruit and meets the giant, who agrees to let the king have the fruit in exchange for him being the prince's godfather. After the boy is born, the giant comes and takes the child with him and gives to an old woman to raise the baby. Years later, when the boy has grown up to a youth, the old woman warns that the giant is a cannibal, and urges him to escape with a horse. He mounts a horse and takes the old woman with him, and flees from the giant. At a distance, the old woman gives the youth a whip and vanishes, for she was the Virgin Mary. The youth, Prince Fernando, wanders with the whip, finds a Black man's corpse and flays his skin to wear it, under the guise of "Pugut-Negru" ("disguised Negro"), and finds work as a shepherd to the king of Albania. He has further adventures: first, he cures the blind king of Albania with some herbs and marries his youngest daughter; then quests for a cure for the queen - lion's milk, which he gives to his future brothers-in-law in exchanging for branding their backs with his name; and finally joins in the war as a mysterious knight to protect the kingdom, is injured and his wife, the third and youngest princess of Albania, bandages his injury without knowing of his true identity. At last, the princess enters Pugut-Negru's hut and finds her husband there, realizing the shepherd and the knight at the war are one and the same.

Literary comparisons
Scholarship has noted similarities of tale types ATU 314 and ATU 502 with the medieval legend of Robert the Devil and its English reworking, Sir Gowther. Years after his birth, Robert/Gowther discovers his unholy parentage and exiles himself in penance in another kingdom. In this kingdom, the king's daughter, who is dumb, is demanded by a sultan. When the king refuses, the sultan prepares to go to war. Robert/Gowther, who has worked in a menial position in the castle, obtains three horses (black, red and white) to defend the kingdom. Likewise, researcher Elisabeth Gaucher also associated the story to tale type 314, known in French academia as Le Teigneux or Le Petit Jardinier aux Cheveux d'Or ("The Golden-Haired Little Gardener").

In addition, scholar Jack Zipes even declared that "almost all folklorists agree" that the Goldener narrative developed during the European Middle Ages.

See also
 Fire Boy (Japanese folktale)
 The Turtle Prince (folktale)
 The Boy with the Moon on his Forehead
 Kaloghlan (Turkish folk hero)
 Prince Ring

Footnotes

References

Lithuanian fairy tales
Horses in literature
ATU 300-399
ATU 500-559